Ahouanou is a town in southern Ivory Coast. It is a sub-prefecture of Grand-Lahou Department in Grands-Ponts Region, Lagunes District.

Ahouanou was a commune until March 2012, when it became one of 1126 communes nationwide that were abolished.

In 2021, the population of the sub-prefecture of Ahouanou was 33,939.

Villages
The 7 villages of the sub-prefecture of Ahouanou and their population in 2014 are:
 Ahouanou (21 533)
 Ahougnanfoutou (1 304)
 Dongbo (2 214)
 Nianda (2 641)
 Palmindustrie Tamabo Nord (1 296)
 Palmindustrie Tamabo Sud  (2 698)
 Tamabo Village (3 318)

References

Sub-prefectures of Grands-Ponts
Former communes of Ivory Coast